The 1975 Victorian Football Association season was the 94th season of the top division of the Australian rules football competition, and the 15th season of second division competition. The Division 1 premiership was won by the Geelong West Football Club, after it defeated Dandenong in the Grand Final on 21 September by 28 points; it was the first and only Division 1 premiership won by Geelong West in its time in the Association. The Division 2 premiership was won by Brunswick; it was Brunswick's first premiership in either division since 1938.

Division 1 
The Division 1 home-and-away season was played over 18 rounds; the top four then contested the finals under the Page–McIntyre system. The finals were played at the St Kilda Cricket Ground.

Ladder

Finals

Awards 
 The leading goalkicker for the season was Joe Radojevic (Geelong West), who kicked 110 goals in the home-and-away season and 119 goals overall.
 The J. J. Liston Trophy was won by Derek King (Oakleigh), who polled 32 votes. King finished ahead of Peter Marshall (Preston), who finished second with 30 votes, and Alan Mannix (Coburg), who finished third with 24 votes.
 Coburg won the seconds premiership; it was the second consecutive season that Coburg had won the seconds premiership, with the first of those coming in Division 2. Coburg 17.13 (115) defeated Port Melbourne 9.13 (67) in the Grand Final, played as a stand-alone match on Saturday 13 September.
 Prahran won the lightning premiership. Prahran 7.2 (44) defeated Northcote 3.5 (23) in the Grand Final, played as a curtain-raiser to the senior Grand Final on Sunday 21 September.

Division 2 
The Division 2 home-and-away season was played over eighteen rounds; the top four then contested the finals under the Page–McIntyre system; all finals were played on Sundays at Toorak Park.

Ladder

Finals

Awards 
 The leading goalkicker for Division 2 was Garry Hammond (Camberwell) who kicked 103 goals in the home-and-away season, and 112 goals overall.
 The J. Field Medal was won by Geoff Bryant (Box Hill), who polled 49 votes; it was Bryant's second Field medal in three years, each won by a considerable margin, and each won despite Box Hill finishing last on the ladder. Bryant finished ahead of Barry Nolan (Brunswick), who finished second with 26 votes, and George Stone (Camberwell), who finished third with 24 votes.
 Northcote won the seconds premiership. Northcote 15.18 (108) defeated Brunswick 13.12 (90) in the Grand Final on Saturday, 6 September.

Notable events

Interleague matches 
For the first time since 1968, and the first time since its expulsion from the Australian National Football Council, the Association played an interleague representative match. The match was played in Wangaratta against the Ovens and Murray Football League. The match was played during the lean half of a split-round in the Association fixture, and selection in the team was controversially limited to players from the twelve clubs which were idle that weekend – which automatically excluded 40% of Association players from eligibility. Colin Hobbs (Coburg) captained the team.

Other notable events 
 On 18 May, Werribee ended a long losing streak against Frankston; Frankston had won its previous seventeen matches against Werribee.
 During the season, Sandringham became the first Association club to hold a full liquor licence.
 On 27 July, Northcote trailed Yarraville by 50 points at quarter time, before coming from behind to win by 32 points; Northcote 22.15 (147) d. Yarraville 17.13 (115).
 Camberwell opened the season with thirteen consecutive victories, but failed to win another home-and-away match season and fell to second on the ladder. It fared little better in the finals, barely holding on for a three-point preliminary final win after leading by 40 points during the final quarter, but losing its other two finals comfortably.
 Eighteen minutes into the final quarter of the Division 1 preliminary final, Port Melbourne led Dandenong by 22 points; Dandenong kicked four goals in the time that remained to steal the match by two points.

External links 
 List of VFA/VFL Premiers

References 

Victorian Football League seasons
VFL